The Pioneers is a 1926 Australian silent film directed by Raymond Longford. The script had been written by Lottie Lyell but she had died by the time filming started. It was considered a lost film but some surviving footage from it has recently emerged.

Synopsis
The story of a Scottish settler and his wife, Donald and Mary Cameron, who live in the Gippsland bush, with their son David. They adopt the daughter of an ex-convict and raise him as their own. The daughter and David Cameron fall in love, but she marries another man.

Cast
Virginia Beresford
William Thornton as David Cameron
Robert Purdie as Donald Cameron
Connie Martyn as Mary Cameron
Augustus Neville
George Chalmers
W. Dummitt
'Big' Bill Wilson
Sydney Hackett
Phyllis Culbert

Production
Katharine Susannah Prichard's novel had won a £1,000 prize in 1915 and had previously been filmed by Franklyn Barrett in 1916.

It was directed by Raymond Longford who in September 1925 had accepted a position of director of productions at Australasian Films. He worked on several films for them but the association ended badly. The director complained that the cast of The Pioneers was forced upon him.

Filming took place on location near Gosford and at Australasian's studios in Bondi Junction in early 1926. During the shooting of one sequence, William Thornton was thrown from his horse and was seriously injured. Because they were so far from a town, first aid was performed by Longford himself, who had had medical training. Longford sewed four stitches into Thornton's head.

Reception
The critic for the Sydney Morning Herald wrote that:
Raymond Longford's latest Australian production...  is a distinct advance on his last picture, "The Bushwhackers". Its photography and settings are equal to the best American, and a vein of natural sincerity runs right through its acting. The story, too, is more definite. In fact, from the state of having practically no story at all, Mr. Longford has run to the other extreme and tried to bring in too much story, so that after one has been looking at the picture for nearly two hours new issues are still coming in, which would need still another half hour for their adequate solution... Mr. Longford himself seems to have realised that his spectators' patience must be at an end here; for he has suddenly brought the play to a close and left all sorts of important things unexplained... If only The Pioneers could be wound up about half-way or two-thirds of the way through, so as to obviate all this trite melodrama, which has been put in obviously as a sap to the populace, it would stand as a landmark In the history of Australian motion pictures.
Table Talk said the film "presents a vivid story of the old Colonial days in Victoria."

Proposed remake
In 1932 Cinesound Productions announced plans to make a sound version of the novel but no film resulted.

References

External links

The Pioneers at National Film and Sound Archive
The Pioneers at AustLit

Films from Australasian Films
1926 films
Australian drama films
Australian silent feature films
Australian black-and-white films
Films directed by Raymond Longford
1926 drama films
Silent drama films
1920s English-language films